Fort Pickering was built in Memphis Tennessee, by the Confederate Army during the American Civil War. It was taken over by the Union Army to provide control of the Mississippi River south of the city.

History

This area had earthwork mounds built by ancient indigenous peoples and used by the historic Chickasaw people, a band led by Chief Chisca. The former fort site is located within what is now the Chickasaw Heritage Park.

The Memphis bluffs were home to a number of military fortifications, including French Fort Assumption (built by French colonists and militia in 1739), Spanish Fort Fernando de las Barrancas, and early American Fort Adams. The first Fort Pickering, a frontier station and trading post, was built in 1798 and remained in operation until 1814. A small town grew up around the fort and was later incorporated into Memphis during a period of rapid growth in the mid 1800s.

Meriwether Lewis 
On September 4, 1809, Meriwether Lewis, now the Governor of the Upper Louisiana Territory, left St. Louis for Washington, DC. He traveled to Fort Pickering by boat, intending to proceed down the Mississippi River to New Orleans and then Washington, DC by ship. Lewis arrived at Fort Pickering on September 15th, and commanding officer Captain Gilbert C. Russell immediately realized that the governor was ill and mentally unstable. He placed Lewis under house arrest, put him under the care of the surgeon’s mate W.C. Smith, and installed Lewis in his own quarters. After several days, Lewis's condition improved, and he was allowed to travel again. However, rumors of war with Britain, and, possibly, the thought of his journals from the Corps of Discovery falling into British hands, changed his travel plans. On September 29th, he left Fort Pickering, taking an overland route. Twelve days later, on October 11th, Lewis was found dead at Grinder's Stand on the Natchez Trace.

Civil War 
During the American Civil War, the Confederate States Army built Fort Pickering on the site. The Confederates dug out the top of the mound and placed artillery there. An ammunition bunker was dug into the side of the mound.

Union forces captured Memphis in June 1862. The Union army enlarged and expanded several areas of the fort. "The newly constructed fort stretched nearly two miles along the south Memphis bluffs from where DeSoto Park (Chickasaw Heritage Park) is located, all the way to Beale Street. It was outfitted with 55 guns and included structures needed to serve the large number of troops living in Memphis and those passing through. The Indian mounds were hollowed out and artillery was placed there, along with an ammunition bunker which was dug into the side of the mound.  Buildings included a hospital, rail depot, water works, and a saw mill."

However, Fort Pickering's defenses were never put to the test and Union forces held Memphis throughout the war. The fort served as a major Union staging area during the Vicksburg Campaign.

Status
After Fort Pickering was demolished in 1866, all traces of the fort were removed and  Memphis forgot about it - until 2007, when there was interest about the possibility of finding Civil War remnants still around.  Trenches were excavated and archaeologists were able to identify two cisterns, brick foundation piers, and particularly, evidence of the defensive parapet and ditch.  Further excavations found very few actual Civil War items.  They had been thorough in the demolition of 1866.  The items that were found were mostly evidence of an earlier residential area of a young Memphis.

References

External links
 Archaeological Survey Weaver & Associates, 2007.

Pickering
Buildings and structures in Memphis, Tennessee
Military installations closed in 1866
Pickering
Demolished buildings and structures in Tennessee
1739 establishments in the French colonial empire